Srijung is a village development committee in the Himalayas of Terhathum District in the Kosi Zone of eastern Nepal. At the time of the 1991 Nepal census it had a population of 2785 people living in 487 individual households.

References
 ancestry place of Lungfungwa (Limbu)

External links
UN map of the municipalities of Terhathum District

Populated places in Tehrathum District